Kim Beck (born 1970, Colorado) is an American artist living and working in New York City and Pittsburgh, Pennsylvania. Beck works in drawing, sculpture, installation, photography, printmaking and multimedia, focusing her attention on subjects that might otherwise be overlooked. She is especially known for her artist's books and public artworks dealing with the subject of landscape.

Beck's work has been reviewed by media such as Artforum, Art in America, Hyperallergic, KQED, The New York Times, and The Village Voice.

Artist's books
 A Field Guide to Weeds, 2007
 A Flock of Signs, 2014

Public art commissions

Adjutant, 2015
Adjutant is a temporary mural installed on the concrete wall beneath the 10th Street Bypass ramp for the Fort Duquesne Bridge in Pittsburgh, PA. The mural is composed of images of oversized common weeds using silhouettes in shades of black, gray and white. A team of some 150 volunteers organized by Riverlife Pittsburgh executed the work June 6–14, 2015, during the Dollar Bank Three Rivers Arts Festival. The mural is part of #TBD, a concept for public art projects to bring dramatic changes and attention to the downtown Allegheny riverfront underneath the Fort Duquesne Bridge.
This artwork was updated with a BLM mural, and subsequent additions, in June 2020

Wildish, 2014
Wildish was commissioned by the Mural Arts Program of Philadelphia.

The Sky Is the Limit/NYC, 2011 
The Sky Is the Limit/NYC was a temporary skywriting installation in New York City on October 10, 2011.

Space Available, 2011–2012 
Space Available, was installed March 4, 2011 – January 2012 on rooftops along Washington Street, between West 13th Street and Gansevoort Street in [New York City]. Intended to be viewed from the High Line, the exhibition was commissioned by Friends of the High Line.

Selected awards
Beck has received awards from the Sharpe Foundation, MacDowell Colony,
Yaddo,
International Studio & Curatorial Program,
Art Omi International Artists Residency, 
Prix Ars Electronica, 
Pollock-Krasner Foundation, and the
Thomas J. Watson Fellowship.

Exhibition and public collections
Beck has exhibited in solo and group exhibitions in the US and abroad, and her work is in the collections of numerous public collections.

Professional affiliations
Beck is an associate professor in the School of Art at Carnegie Mellon University.

References 

Living people
Rhode Island School of Design alumni
Rhode Island School of Design faculty
Carnegie Mellon University faculty
Brandeis University alumni
Yale University alumni
1970 births